Florenciella is a genus of heterokonts.

References 

Heterokont genera
Dictyochophyceae